The Democratic People's Republic of Korea passport, commonly referred to as the North Korean passport, is the passport which may be issued to North Korean citizens for international travel. Since the majority of North Koreans do not get opportunities to leave the country, DPRK passports are rarely issued.

History

The earliest passports of the Korean Peninsula were issued in 1902 by the Korean Empire, with two types, a trading passport and a travel passport. The passports have Chinese text as well as English and French translations.

North Korean passports were first issued in the 1950s with passport in Korean, Russian and Chinese, while the current passport has Korean and English only.

Physical appearance
DPRK passport covers are navy blue with the National Emblem of the Democratic People's Republic of Korea emblazoned in the center. The words "" (Korean) and "DEMOCRATIC PEOPLE'S REPUBLIC OF KOREA" (English) are inscribed above the emblem, with "" and "PASSPORT" below. (ryŏgwon), means "passport", whilst in the South Korean passport, it is branded  (yŏgwon), which also means passport.

Passport types
 An ordinary passport is a single passport which, after being granted special permission, is handed out to North Koreans who visit foreign countries for official reasons, i.e., sports and academic competitions, business trips. Ordinary passports are taken back by the Ministry of Foreign Affairs after returning to North Korea. Cover is navy blue.
 An official passport is issued for trade and other economic bureaucrats travelling abroad. Cover is green.
 A diplomatic passport is issued to high officials from the Ministry of Foreign Affairs, the Central Committee of the Workers' Party of Korea, and other subordinate offices of the Workers' Party of Korea. For other bureaucrats, only vice ministers or higher can receive a diplomatic passport. Cover is red.

Official and diplomatic passports must be returned and kept in the passport office, from where it can be retrieved for any further foreign travel. Ordinary passports are never issued without special permission and all holders must apply for an exit visa in order to legally leave the country.

Identity pages

A DPRK Passport includes two identity pages. The first identifies the holder, and includes the following information:
1. Passport number
2. Name in full (in Latin and Korean scripts)
3. Date of birth (YY-MM-DD)
4. Place of birth
5. Nationality (specified as "Korean")
6. Length of the passport validity (five years)
7. Expiry date (YY-MM-DD)
8. Issue date (YY-MM-DD)
The second page is for official endorsements.

Note of passport
The passport contains the following note:

Korean:

English:

Inter-Korea travel

Gallery

See also
Citizenship in North Korea
Nationality Law of the Democratic People's Republic of Korea
Visa requirements for North Korean citizens
 Republic of Korea passport 
Visa policy of North Korea
 Korean Empire passport

References

External links

Picture of personal detail in DPRK passport and ROK travel certificate and Japan registration card
DPRK official passport
DPRK Ordinary Passport and ROK Ordinary Passport

New North Korean Passport since 2000

Korea, Democratic People's Republic of
Foreign relations of North Korea